Parvobasidium is a genus of two species of crust fungi in the family Cystostereaceae.

References

Cystostereaceae
Polyporales genera
Fungi described in 1975
Taxa named by Walter Jülich